The Renmin University of China (RUC) is a national key public research university in Beijing, China. The university is affiliated with the Ministry of Education, and co-funded by the Ministry and the Beijing Municipal People's Government.

RUC is designated as a Class A Double First Class University of the Double First Class University Plan and was also funded by Project 985 and Project 211 and is considered the most prestigious university for arts and humanities and social sciences in China. It is also a member of Worldwide Universities Network, the Asia-Pacific Association for International Education, and Beijing-Hong Kong Universities Alliance.

According to the 2021 QS World University by Subject, Renmin University of China was ranked among the top 40 in the world for Philosophy, top 51 in legal studies and law, top 80 in "Social sciences and Management", and top 100 in "Arts and Humanities" related subjects. According to the Financial Times,  Renmin Business School is considered as the top 50 business schools in the world, with its global MBA ranked 38th in the world, Executive MBA ranked 43rd, and its Executive Education ranked 11th in the world (the best in Asia).

History
The origins of Renmin University of China date back to Shanbei Public School, established in 1937 by the Chinese Communist Party in order to "bring up hundreds of thousands of revolutionary comrades to meet the needs of the War of Resistance against Japanese Aggression." Later it was renamed as the North China United University and North China University. 

In 1950, several institutions were merged to form a single Renmin University of China. In 1954, Renmin University of China was established as one of six national key universities of China, becoming the youngest national key university at that time.

Wu Yuzhang, Cheng Fangwu, Guo Yingqiu, Yuan Baohua, Huang Da, Li Wenhai, Ji Baocheng, Chen Yulu had successively held the position of the president of the university.  the president is Lin Shangli.

Present

Currently Renmin University consists of 25 schools, 13 research institutes and the graduate school, with 63 specialties for undergraduate, 8 specialties for the second-bachelor's degree students, 149 specialties for the master's degree candidates, 100 specialties for the Doctor's degree candidates and 33 national key disciplines.

The university library has 2.5 million holdings, and is recognized as the Information Center of Arts Literatures by the Ministry of Education. The new library building opened in the second half of 2011. The Renmin University of China Press is one of the most famous publishers and the first university press in China which has published a large number of academic works in humanities and social sciences. The library of the university covers a total area of 26,000 square meters. It has 15 reading rooms and an economics hall, with more than 2000 seats.

Renmin University has established its communications and cooperative relationships with 125 universities and research institutions of 32 countries and regions, which enables the university to be the center of academic and cultural communications between China and foreign countries.

Schools and departments

The School of Agricultural Economics and Rural Development
The School of Arts
The School of Business
The School of Chinese Classics
The School of Continuing Education
The School of Economics
The School of Education
The School of Environment and Natural Resources
The School of Finance
The School of Foreign Languages
Department of English Studies
Department of French Studies
Department of German Studies
Department of Japanese Studies
Department of Russian Studies
Department of Spanish Studies
The School of History
The School of Information
The School of Information Resource Management
The School of International Studies
Department of International Politics
Department of Foreign Affairs
Department of Politics
The School of Journalism
The School of Labor and Human Resources
The School of Law
The School of Literary Studies
The School of Marxism Studies
The School of Teaching Chinese as Foreign Language
The School of Philosophy
The School of Public Administration and Policy
The School of Statistics
The School of Sociology and Population Studies
Department of Sociology
Department of Social Work
Department of Demography
 The School of Science
 Department of Physics
Department of Chemistry
Department of Psychology
The Institute of Qing History
Sino–French Institute

Rural Reconstruction Center of Renmin University
Rural Reconstruction Center of Renmin University was established in 2005 and is based in Beijing. Its main mission is to explore the theory and practice of rural reconstruction. It partakes in fair trade advocacy and coordinating urban and rural green energy initiatives as well as the promotion of fair education.

Chongyang Institute for Financial Studies
The Chongyang Institute for Financial Studies is a thinktank affiliated with Renmin. Affiliated staff include Vijay Prashad and John Ross. Its executive dean is Wang Wen.

In 2022, Wang Wen visited Russian-annexed Crimea amid the 2022 Russian invasion of Ukraine. His writings have been described as distorting Russia’s annexation of Crimea.

In 2021, a joint report with the Taihe Institute and the Intellisia Institute detailed the alleged failings of the US in the handling of the Covid19 pandemic.

Campuses

Renmin University of China currently possesses two active campus, one campus under construction and one former campus.
 The main campus is located at No.59 Zhongguancun Street, Haidian district, Beijing.  Most of the university's schools, departments and institutes are located here.
The campus's English Corner is very famous in Beijing. Every Friday evening, people gather at the Qiushi Garden near the east gate to practice English. 
The campus is host to about 1,165 international students, many of them from South Korea. There are so many South Korean students that the International Students Dining Room has a separate Korean menu aside from their traditional Chinese menu.
 The university has a secondary campus located in Suzhou Industrial Park, in the South-eastern province of Jiangsu. It is home to the RUC Sino-French Institute (IFC Renmin) and its 900 Chinese and international students. Besides, a number of Chinese and sino-foreign Master-level programs from several RUC faculties are also located on the same grounds under the supervision of RUC International College. RUC Suzhou campus is part of the Suzhou Dushu Lake Higher Education Town, together with other international Sino-Foreign oriented graduate and post-graduate schools such as Xi'an Jiaotong-Liverpool university or the Southeast University-Monash University Joint Graduate School.
 Renmin University is currently building its future main campus in Lucheng, Tongzhou district, currently named "Eastern Campus", to the east of Beijing central area. It will be located in the same town as the soon-to-be relocated Beijing municipal government facilities. Completion date is expected by the end of year 2017.
 The former main campus of Renmin University of China is located east of the Forbidden City, in the Dongcheng district. Although the property still belongs to the university, it is no longer used for educational purposes.

Cultural tradition
The motto of Renmin University: "Seek truth from facts";
The spirit of Renmin University-"Establishing learning for the people, and governing the country";
The goal of talent training of Renmin University: "a national example, a social pillar";
The idea of running Renmin University: "people, people-oriented, and humanistic"-this is also the meaning of the three parallel "人" characters in the seal script on Renmin University's emblem.

School Song
The school song of Renmin University of China has gone through multiple versions, including the "Song of Northern Shaanxi Public School" created in Yan'an in 1937, "The School Song of North China Associated University" in Shanxi-Chahar-Hebei border area in 1937, and "School Song of North China University" in Zhengding, Hebei in 1948., "Song of Renmin University of China" written by Wu Yuzhang, "Song of Renmin University of China" written by Cheng Fangwu, and "Song of Renmin University of China" written by Ji Baocheng.
"The Song of Renmin University of China", written by Ji Baocheng, was identified as the school song in 2007, replacing the old school song that has been adopted since 1980 with a strong political color.
In 2017, "Song of Northern Shaanxi Public School" was identified as the representative school song of Renmin University of China.

Rankings and reputation 
Renmin University of China is generally considered one of the most competitive in the country as it only admits students whose national entrance examination score ranks the top 0.1% in each province/state.  Several rankings have placed Renmin University of China among the top universities in mainland China. In 2015, the Chinese University Alumni Association in partnership with China Education Center considered it 5th among all Chinese universities. The Times Higher Education World University Rankings 2014 placed Renmin University of China 5th in China after (Peking, Tsinghua, University of Science and Technology of China, and Fudan) and #13 in emerging countries, # 32 in Asia and # 226-250 in the world.

In 2020, the QS World University Rankings ranked the university as one of the world's top 300 universities for academic reputation and employer reputation. Renmin University graduates are highly desired in China and worldwide, with its Graduate Employability rankings placed in the Global Top 181-190th universities with high-achieving graduates every year according to the 2022 QS Graduate Employability Rankings.

Subject Rankings 
According to the latest evaluation by the Chinese ministry of education RUC ranked No.1 among all Chinese Universities for 9 disciplines which include Theoretical economics, Applied economics, Law & Legal studies, Political science, Sociology, Journalism, Statistics, Business management and Public administration. RUC is also entitled 25 national key disciplines (ranks No.5 of China), 13 national key research bases of humanities and social sciences (ranks No.1 of China), and 6 national teaching and research bases of fundamental arts disciplines (ranks No.1 of China). Renmin has taken a leading position among Chinese universities in the number of social science and arts and humanities-related majors. For example, in the 2022 Rankings of Chinese universities by undergraduate majors in 92 professional categories, Renmin had 25 majors ranking #1 nationwide, 48 majors in the top 5 and 57 majors in the top 10.

According to the 2021 QS World University by Subject, Renmin University was ranked among the top 100 in the world in "Arts and Humanities" & "Social Sciences & Management" related subjects. According to the 2021 QS World University by Subject, the university was ranked among the top 40 in the world for Philosophy, top 80 in social sciences and management and top 51 in legal studies and law.

According to the Financial Times, the Renmin Business School is considered as the top 50 business schools in the world, with its global MBA ranked 38th in the world, Executive MBA ranked 43rd, and its Executive Education ranked 11th in the world (the best in Asia).

As of 2022, the U.S. News & World Report ranked Renmin # 5 in China, #12 in Asia and # 83 globally in Economics and Business.

As of 2022, According to the Academic Ranking of World Universities, Renmin ranked 35th in the world for Public Administration, 76th globally in Finance, 101st in the world for Economics and Management, and 151st in the world for Statistics, 201st globally in Business Administration, Law, Psychology, Environment and Geography, and 301st in Political Science, Computer Science and Material Science.

Notable faculty

Huang Da - Professor Emeritus, School of Finance; President, Renmin University of China (1991-1994).
Jin Canrong - Professor, School of International Studies.
Liu Xiaofeng - Professor, School of Liberal Arts.
Manuel Pérez García - Former Associate Professor, School of International Studies (2013-2017).
Mao Shoulong - Professor, School of Public Administration.
Pan Suiming - Professor, School of Sociology and Population Studies, renowned scholar of sexology.
Shi Yinhong - Professor, School of International Studies, see :zh:时殷弘
Song Xinning - Jean Monnet Professor, School of International Studies. 
Wang Liming - Professor and former dean (2005–09), School of Law, renowned scholar of civil law.
Wen Tiejun - Professor and dean, School of Agricultural Economics and Rural Development.
Wu Xiaoqiu - Professor, School of Finance.
Yang Ruilong - Professor and dean, School of Economics.
Baron von Pfetten - Visiting Professor, School of Economics.
Zeng Xianyi - Professor Emeritus and former dean (1990-2005), School of Law, renowned scholar of legal history.
Zhang Kangzhi (张康之) - Professor in the Department of Public Administration.
Zhang Ming - Professor, School of International Studies.
Zhou Xiaozheng - Professor, School of Sociology and Population Studies.

Notable alumni
Since 2017, Renmin has graduated at least 44 billionaires, putting it in sixth place nationally after Tsinghua, Peking, Zhejiang, Fudan and Shanghai Jiao tong.

Academics
Liu Yu - Political scientist at Tsinghua University, author of national bestseller "Details of Democracy." Liu earned PhD from Columbia University, conducted postdoctoral work at Harvard and taught at Cambridge University for three years.
Qian Liqun - Professor, Department of Chinese Language and Literature, Peking University.
Wu Shuqing - President of Peking University (1989-1996), economist.
Zheng Wentong - Professor, University of Florida Levin College of Law. Zheng earned PhD in economics and JD from Stanford University.
Zhou Qiren - Economist (PhD, UCLA), Director of the National School of Development (previously known as the Chinese Center for Economic Research, CCER), Peking University.
Zhao Tingyang, political philosopher at the Chinese Academy of Social Sciences

Law and politics

 Han Xu - Ambassador to the United States (1985-1989).
 Liu Yandong - Current highest-ranking female politician in China, and the only woman with a seat on the Politburo.
 Ma Kai - Chairman of the National Development and Reform Commission (2003-2008).
 Xiao Yang - Chief Justice of the Supreme People's Court (1998-2003, 2003–2008).
 Wang Ju-hsuan - Minister of Council of Labor Affairs of the Republic of China (2008-2012).
 Chen Yu-Lu 陈雨露 - Deputy governor of People's Bank of China (2015- ).
 Grace Mugabe - Former First Lady of Zimbabwe from (1996-2017)
Liu He - A member of the politburo of the Chinese Communist Party, one of the vice premiers of the People's Republic of China and the director of the Central Financial and Economic Affairs Commission

Business and media

Duan Yongping - entrepreneur and investor, founder of Subor (English: Xiao Ba Wang) and BBK. Duan and his wife Liu Xin donated US$30 million to Renmin University in March 2010.
Hu Shuli - Founder and editor-in-chief of the prestigious business magazine, Caijing the most powerful and popular financial magazine.
Liu Lefei - chairman, Citic Private Equity Funds Management.
Pan Gongsheng - Executive Vice President, Agricultural Bank of China. Pan led the AgBank's US$22.1 billion IPO (the largest IPO in the world) in 2010, and the Industrial and Commercial Bank of China's US$21.9 billion IPO (then world record) in 2006.
Wang Qing - Chief Economist, Morgan Stanley Greater China (2007- ).
Xiang Junbo - chairman, Agricultural Bank of China (2009- ).
Xiao Gang - chairman, Bank of China (2003- ).
 Yang Weiguang - President, China Central Television (CCTV) (1991-1999).
Zhang Lei - Founder and President of Hillhouse Capital Management, donated $8,888,888 to School of Management, Yale at 2010.
Liu Qiangdong - Founder and President of JD.com, the largest Chinese B2C e-commercial platform.
Li Xueling - Founder and President of www.yy.com, YY is an online social entertainment platform that engages users through audio, video and text in a wide range of online group activities, such as music shows, live video streaming and multi-player gaming. With a capacity to support over one million participants concurrently, YY offers users a more immersive, interactive, enriching and engaging entertainment experience through its large social community.

Human Rights Activist
Bob Fu - One of the organizers of the Tiananmen Square protests of 1989, he founded China Aid to provide legal aid to dissidents in China.

Writers

Wang Xiaobo- Modern writer, popular and influential among China's youth. He is also the husband of Li Yinhe, renowned sociologist and sexologist.
Zhang Jie - Writer, graduated from RUC in 1960. Her work has won many prizes.

Others

James Veneris and Samuel David Hawkins - American soldiers in the Korean War who were captured by the North, then defected to China at the time of armistice.
Guo Jingjing - 3m Springboard and Synchronized Springboard gold medals winner at the 2004 Summer Olympics
Wang Junxia - Winner of a gold medal and a silver medal in woman's track in the 1996 Summer Olympics; record holder of the woman's 10000m from 1993 with a time of 29:31:78.
Zeng Jinyan - Human rights activist, one of the Time 100, 2007; wife of Hu Jia, recipient of the Sakharov Prize for Freedom of Thought in 2008.
Zhang Zhixin - Dissident imprisoned and executed for criticising the idolisation of Mao Zedong during the Cultural Revolution.
Liang Yan - National Women's volleyball team member
Dai Yi - Historian
Lin Yue - Gold medalist, Olympian, 10m platform Diving
Huo Liang - Gold medalist, Olympian, 10m Platform Diving
Li Ting - Gold medalist, Olympian, 10m Platform Diving
Peng Bo - Gold medalist, Olympian, 3m Springboard Diving
Wu Minxia - Gold medalist, Olympian, 3m Springboard Diving
Sang Xue - Gold medalist, Olympian, 10m platform Diving
Robert S. Paywala - Asst. Coordinator, Research and Actuarial Department, National Social Security and Welfare Corporation, Republic of Liberia

Global reach

Renmin University maintains collaborative relationships and exchange programs with many well-known universities around the world, such as Queen's University, Boston College Law School, Columbia University, Ludwig Maximilian University of Munich, Princeton University, University of Geneva, McGill University, Queen Mary University of London, King's College London, Waseda University, Carleton University, the University of Chicago, Rutgers, The State University of New Jersey, the University of Michigan and Yale University. In January 2010, Zhang Lei, a graduate of Renmin University and Yale School of Management (SOM), donated US$8,888,888 to the SOM, the largest alumni gift the school had received.

It is also a member of Worldwide Universities Network, the Asia-Pacific Association for International Education, and Beijing-Hong Kong Universities Alliance.

Renmin University School of Labor and Human Resources maintains an exchange relationship with the Huamin Research Center and the School of Social Work at Rutgers University. Every year since 2010, study abroad students and faculty from Rutgers exchange with their Renmin University counterparts. Renmin University is a popular destination for visiting foreign dignitaries. During his state visit to China in January 2008, British Prime Minister Gordon Brown visited Renmin University with Premier Wen Jiabao to talk with students, scholars, athletes and entrepreneurs.

The School of International Studies offers a Double Masters in Asian and European Affairs with King's College London.

Renmin University students are actively engaged in academic and exchange programs overseas, such as the National Model United Nations conference held annually in the New York City.

The University of Chicago Center in Beijing, which opened in September 2010, is located at the Culture Plaza on the Renmin University campus.

High school

The High School Affiliated with Renmin University of China is one of the most prestigious high schools in Beijing, and is a sister school of Phillips Academy in Massachusetts, Phillips Exeter Academy in New Hampshire and Punahou Academy in Honolulu.

See also

References

External links

  
Chin Renmin University Press 
TDRD Internet Bulletin The quasi-official student internet forum of Renmin University 
RUCOL Forum A non-official student internet forum of Renmin University 

 
1937 establishments in China
Educational institutions established in 1937
Project 211
Project 985
Plan 111
Universities and colleges in Haidian District
Vice-ministerial universities in China